Pharmacis aemilianus is a moth of the family Hepialidae. It is known from Italy.

References

Moths described in 1911
Hepialidae
Endemic fauna of Italy
Moths of Europe